was a Japanese novelist. He was born in Yokkaichi, Mie, and was educated at Waseda University in Tokyo where he studied literature. His most famous work is Gate of Flesh, which has been adapted into a movie four times and most recently in 2008 into a TV Asahi television series. His work is known for its emphasis on carnality and the physical body.

Films
Gate of Flesh (Nikutai no mon) was first adapted by directors Masahiro Makino and Masafusa Ozaki in 1948, just one year after the publication of the novel. Later adaptions were by directors Seijun Suzuki (1964), Shōgorō Nishimura (1977), and Hideo Gosha (1988, as Carmen 1945). 

Director Senkichi Taniguchi adapted another novel of Tamura in his film Escape at Dawn in 1950, which was remade by Seijun Suzuki as Story of a Prostitute in 1965.

References

1911 births
1983 deaths
People from Yokkaichi
Japanese writers
20th-century Japanese people